David Rush (born 15 May 1971) is an English former professional footballer.

He played in the 1992 FA Cup Final for his home town club Sunderland, which they lost 2–0 against Liverpool.

After several loan moves, Rush made a permanent move to Oxford United for a reported £100,000. In his first full season with Oxford, he helped them to automatic promotion to Division 1 (now Championship). Following his release from Oxford, Rush had short spells with York City and Hartlepool United.

On 19 May 2009, Rush was confirmed as the manager of Northern League side Hebburn Town, but resigned from his post in mid-September.

On 3 January 2013, Rush was named assistant manager of Conference Premier side Gateshead, joining former Sunderland teammate Anth Smith.

On 18 August 2013, Rush was named caretaker manager at Gateshead following the resignation of Anth Smith. He returned to the role of assistant on 3 September after Gary Mills was named manager. On 25 September 2013, Rush left Gateshead after being replaced as assistant manager by Darren Caskey.

On 27 September 2013 he started his own football academy for local boys aged between 8 and 16 from Whickham and the surrounding area, to encourage and spot talented players and to arrange trials with local football academies and teams.

Managerial statistics

References

Living people
1971 births
Footballers from Sunderland
English footballers
Association football forwards
Notts County F.C. players
Sunderland A.F.C. players
Hartlepool United F.C. players
Peterborough United F.C. players
Cambridge United F.C. players
Oxford United F.C. players
York City F.C. players
Seaham Red Star F.C. players
English football managers
Gateshead F.C. non-playing staff
Gateshead F.C. managers
Hebburn Town F.C. managers
National League (English football) managers
FA Cup Final players